The 2019–20 Syed Mushtaq Ali Trophy was the eleventh season of the Syed Mushtaq Ali Trophy, a Twenty20 cricket tournament in India. It was contested by 38 teams, divided into five groups, with seven teams in Group A. The group stage started on 8 November 2019. The top two teams from Group A progressed to the Super League section of the competition.

A day before the start of tournament, Goa sacked their captain C. M. Gautam after he was arrested due to his alleged involvement in match fixing in Karnataka Premier League. Darshan Misal was appointed as their new captain. On the opening day of the tournament, Karnataka beat Uttarakhand by nine wickets, setting a new record for the most consecutive wins in T20 matches in India, with fifteen.

Following the conclusion of matches played on 17 November 2019, Baroda and Karnataka had progressed to the Super League stage of the tournament.

Points table

Fixtures

Round 1

Round 2

Round 3

Round 4

Round 5

Round 6

Round 7

References

Syed Mushtaq Ali Trophy
Syed Mushtaq Ali Trophy
Syed Mushtaq Ali